Israel competed at the 2018 Winter Olympics in Pyeongchang, South Korea, from 9 to 25 February 2018, with ten competitors in four sports.

Competitors
The following is a list of the number of Israeli competitors participating at the Games per sport/discipline.

Alpine skiing 

Israel qualified one male alpine skier.

Figure skating 

In the 2017 World Figure Skating Championships in Helsinki, Finland, Oleksii Bychenko finished in 10th place with 245.96 points, and earned two quota places for the Israeli delegation in the men’s event. Isabella Tobias and Ilia Tkachenko finished in 12th place with 162.67 points, and earned one quota place in the ice dancing event.

In the 2017 CS Nebelhorn Trophy in Oberstdorf, Germany, Evgeni Krasnopolski and Paige Conners finished in 8th place with 171.61 points and earned one quota place in the Pairs event.

Bychenko and Daniel Samohin competed in the Men's singles event. Krasnopolski and Conners competed in the Pairs event. In Ice Dancing, Ronald Zilberberg and Adel Tankova represented Israel after Tkachenko’s requests for Israeli citizenship was denied. Aimee Buchanan participated in the Team event in the Ladies contest, after Israel ranked among the top ten countries.

Singles

Team event

Short track speed skating 

Israel won a quota after Vladislav Bykanov participated at 2017–18 ISU Short Track Speed Skating World Cup Competitions.

Qualification legend: ADV – Advanced due to being impeded by another skater; FA – Qualify to medal round; FB – Qualify to consolation round; AA – Advance to medal round due to being impeded by another skater

Skeleton 

Adam Edelman earned a spot for Israel through reallocation.

References

Nations at the 2018 Winter Olympics
2018
Winter Olympics